Lancaster Friary was a friary  in Lancashire, England. The buildings were approximately where Dalton Square is found today. It was active between 1260 and 1539 . Nothing remains. Two archaeological trenches were dug in 1981 and 1994; they exposed some tiles and wall footings.

References

Monasteries in Lancashire
Buildings and structures in Lancaster, Lancashire